Cecil W. "Hootie" Ingram (born September 2, 1933) is a former American football player, coach, and college athletics administrator.  He played for the University of Alabama from 1952 to 1954 and was selected as an All-SEC defensive back in 1952.  He worked as an assistant football coach at several colleges, including the University of Georgia and University of Arkansas before receiving a head coaching assignment at Clemson University from 1970 to 1972.  He was an administrator with the Southeastern Conference in the 1970s and later served as an athletic director at Florida State University (1981–89) and Alabama (1989–95).

Early years
A native of Tuscaloosa, Alabama, Ingram is the son of Wayne and Ella Ingram.  He attended Tuscaloosa High School, where he received four varsity letters in basketball and three each in football and baseball.  In his senior year, he was selected as an All-State halfback, elected to the All-Fifth District basketball team, and played East-West All-Star baseball in Birmingham, Alabama.  He graduated from Tuscaloosa High School in 1951.

University of Alabama
Ingram enrolled at the University of Alabama in the fall of 1951 where he was a multi-sport star.  He won three letters each in football and baseball.  He won acclaim as a football player for the Crimson Tide football teams from 1952 to 1954.

As a sophomore in 1952, Ingram was selected as an All-SEC defensive back.  In December 1952, the United Press International ran a feature story on Ingram calling him the "Tide's Honorable Thief," due to his talent for intercepting passes.  The story gave warning to Alabama's Orange Bowl opponent, "Pre-Orange Bowl warning to Syracuse: beware of Cecil Ingram, an honorable thief.  The slender Alabama sophomore safetyman stole more passes thrown by opponents than any other man in the Southeastern Conference this year."  His ten interceptions for 162 yards in 1952 (including two returned for touchdowns) tied the Southeastern Conference record for interceptions in a season.  He added an eleventh interception in the 1953 Orange Bowl game on January 1, 1953, as Alabama crushed Syracuse 61–6.  He also set an Alabama Orange Bowl record with an 80-yard punt return in the 1953 Orange Bowl.

During the 1953 football season, Ingram was moved to the quarterback position on an Alabama team that included Pro Football Hall of Fame quarterback Bart Starr.  He also played at the halfback position in 1953.

As a senior in 1954, Ingram played at the halfback position, with Bart Starr filling the quarterback position for the Crimson Tide.  In September 1954, he ran 68 yards for a touchdown against LSU.

In March 1955, Ingram signed a contract to play professional football for the Philadelphia Eagles, though he never played in any regular season games for the Eagles.

Football coach
Ingram began a coaching career in July 1956 when he was hired as an assistant football coach at Manatee High School in Bradenton, Florida.  At Manatee, he served on the staff of head coach Wheeler Leeth, who had been Ingram's high school football coach in Tuscaloosa.  In June 1957, he returned to Tuscaloosa to serve as a head football coach at Brookwood High School.  In February 1958, he was hired as the head football coach and athletic director at Tuscaloosa County High School.  He then held assistant coach positions at Wake Forest (1960), Virginia Tech (1961–1963), and Georgia (1964–1966).  From 1967 to 1969, he served as a defensive coach under Frank Broyles at  the University of Arkansas, earning a reputation as "a defensive genius."  In December 1969, he was hired as the head football coach at Clemson University.  He served three seasons as Clemson's head coach from 1970 to 1972, compiling a 12–21 record.  He resigned as Clemson's head coach in December 1972.  He is notable for having introduced the trademark "tiger paw" logo to Clemson.

Head coaching record

Athletic director and administrator
After resigning his position at Clemson, Ingram spent eight years working on the staff of the Southeastern Conference, first as assistant commissioner for administration as associate commissioner.  In January 1981, Ingram was hired as the athletic director at Florida State University.  Ingram remained as Florida State's athletic director until September 1989, at which time he returned to his alma mater, signing a five-year contract as the University of Alabama's athletic director.  Ingram hired Gene Stallings as Alabama's football coach, and the Crimson Tide won the college football national championship in 1992.  Ingram stepped down as Alabama's athletic director in August 1995 after being reprimanded for his role in rules violations that led the NCAA to place the school on probation for three years.  Ingram said he could no longer effectively serve as athletic director after the NCAA's rebuke and asked to be reassigned.

Honors and awards
In 1991, Ingram was inducted into the Alabama Sports Hall of Fame.  In 1999, he was inducted into the Orange Bowl Hall of Fame.  He was also honored in 1992 as a second-team defensive back on Alabama's "Team of the Century."  In 2007, the University of Alabama National Alumni Association presented Ingram with the Paul W. Bryant Alumni-Athlete Award.  The award recognizes athletes whose accomplishments since leaving the University are "outstanding based on character, contributions to society, professional achievement and service."

References

1933 births
Living people
American football defensive backs
American football halfbacks
American football quarterbacks
Alabama Crimson Tide athletic directors
Alabama Crimson Tide baseball players
Alabama Crimson Tide football players
Arkansas Razorbacks football coaches
Clemson Tigers football coaches
Florida State Seminoles athletic directors
Georgia Bulldogs football coaches
Virginia Tech Hokies football coaches
High school football coaches in Florida
Wake Forest Demon Deacons football coaches
Sportspeople from Tuscaloosa, Alabama
Players of American football from Alabama
High school football coaches in Alabama